The Eloquent Ji Xiaolan is a Chinese television series about the life of Ji Xiaolan. The series was directed by Zhang Guoli and consists of a total of 173 episodes shot in high definition, each 45 minutes long and containing 10 minutes of 3-D effects.  The series is based on events during the reign of the Qianlong Emperor in the Qing dynasty.

Plot

Season 1 
Involved in several events, Ji Xiaolan always tried to achieve justice, while the corruptive Heshen and his fellows always held him back. After initial misunderstanding two swords-women Mo Chou and Du Xiaoyue joined Ji Xiaolan. Qianlong Emperor always knew what Heshen had done but never punish him severely.

Season 2 
Mo Chou, who during the last episodes of Season 1 had born Qianlong Emperor a son and become his imperial concubine, never reappeared in the following seasons due to audience criticism and was only mentioned in a few conversations.

Season 3 
Du Xiaoyue never appeared due to the absence of her role player Yuan Li, claimed to have been married off. A new girl named Lu Linlang was introduced to be her replacement.

Season 4 
Lu Linlang, claimed to have left, did not reappear; After her husband was killed by corruptive officials associated with Heshen, Du Xiaoyue rejoined Ji Xiaolan.

Cast
 Zhang Guoli as Ji Xiaolan
 Wang Gang as Heshen
 Zhang Tielin as the Qianlong Emperor
 Yuan Li as Du Xiaoyue
 Zhao Minfen/ Yan Minqiu/ Wang Liyuan as Empress Xiaoshengxian
 Zhang Ting as Lu Linlang
 Yang Xiyan/ Zhang Lei/ Liu Kaifei as Xing'er
 Zhang Chunnian as Liu Quan
 Cynthia Khan as Mo Chou
 Xiang Neng as Fuk'anggan
 Pan Xiaoli as Zhao Qing

Others

Season 1 
 Cong Peixin as Censor Hong
 Wu Zhen as Hong Xia
 Shu Yaoxuan as Shang Rong
 Liu Weihua as Royal Highness 
 Huo Siyan as Xiangcao
 Zeng Jing as Lǚ Chang'an
 Han Fuyi as Huang Bingtang
 Zhang Jing as Tao Xiangyun
 Li Xiaolei  as Chen Weiyuan
 Li Qingxiang as Businessman Jin
 Ruan Danning as Su Qinglian
 Yan Huaili as Chen Huizu
 Jia Dazhong as Wang Shanwang
 Yang Junyong as Wang Tingzan
 Liu Yuanyuan as Chuntao

Season 2 
 Liu Yanjun as Zhao Xinjin
 Ma Zijun as Zhang Wanjie
 Hong Zongyi as Zuo Shankui
 Bai Qiulin as Zhao Wenlong
 Zou Hewei as Min De
 Song Dong as Wu Shengqin
 Wang Shenshen as Liao Fan
 Ma Weifu as Xu Qingyu
 Xu Meiling as The procuress 
 Wei Wei as Xiao Hongyan
 Ma Yili as Yan Ruyu
 Sun Yan as Dai Zhan
 Gao Yuqing as Hong Zhongyu
 Pan Guangju as Yan Ji
 Lu Hualei as Lao Cai
 Zhang Yuchun as Wu Shaofu
 Lu Donglai as Ye Tingbin
 Cui Jian as Qi Sutu
 Zhong Yuan as Gu Dali
 Fu Di as Li Chunmei
 Wang Bing as Li Xiaochun
 Zhang Jingyu as Hong San
 Lu Xiaoyi as Qi An
 Dang Yongde as Li San
 Ma Jie as Hai Sheng
 Ma Lun as Gui Ning
 Hao Zi as Mian En
 Wang Jingming as Wu Shenglan
 Li Geng as Jia San
 Guo Lihong as Xiaofang
 Yuan Hongqi as Ren Gang
 Lin Yongjian as Lu Chao
 Jiang Xinyan as Yao Qin

Season 3 
 Huang Xiaolei as Changsi
 Xu Xiaodan as Hoifa-Nara, the Step Empress
 Li Yixiao as Honglian
 Li Lihong as Yue Jinzhi
 He Jinlong as Guo Min 
 Liu Naiyi as Ma Rufeng
 Hao Subei as Yu Tiexin
 Song Dong as Gu Yezhi
 Chen Dacheng as A Gui
 Zhang Yue as Mingyue
 Wang Jianing as Chu Ming
 Zhang Mo as Yuan Hong
 Li Shijiang as Hua Jianmeng
 He Shengwei as Liu Shunmin
 Xia Lixin as Sai Huahong
 Wu Xiaodong as Hong Hai

Season 4 
 Yan Ni as Ge Song'er
 Hu Guangzi  as He Wenjin
 Gao Xinde as Chunhong
 Han Yuqin as Mei Yingxue
 Du Jun as Yi'ertai
 Zhao Hongfei as Cui Yuyan
 Miriam Yeung as Qianqian
 Shi Lin as Lizhi
 He Yongsheng as Ren Caomu
 Li Heng as Tao Dabao
 Liu Yong as Fugui

Inconsistencies with History
According to historical accounts:
Liu Quan was older than Heshen.
Ji Xiaolan had a good relationship with Heshen while Fuk'anggan did not.
Qianlong Emperor and Ji Xiaolan were 39 and 26 years senior than Heshen respectively, but in the series the three were described as peers.
Heshen did not have 13 concubines, while Qianlong Emperor did not have 18 daughters.
When Prince Yunti died, Heshen and Fuk'anggan were only 5 and 1 respectively, but in Season 1 the three were described as peers.
During Qing dynasty the status of actors was low, thus Du Xiaoyue would never be adopted by the Empress Dowager as a princess and married to Scholar Zhu Junhao (claimed to have died of illness at the beginning of Season 2).
Qing emperors were never prohibited to take Han women as imperial consorts as Seasons 1 and 3 suggested, while the mother of future Jiaqing Emperor was of Han ethnicity.
The event of deposing the Empress in Season 3 happened in 1765, while the event of marrying a princess to Fengšeninde in Season 1 happened in 1789, 12 years after the death of the Empress Dowager. In history the Empress was deprived of her rights as empress but never formally demoted to a consort.
Fuk'anggan was implied to be a bastard of Qianlong in Season 4, which actually had been proven to be fictitious.

Contradictions in Itself 
In later versions, some dialogues of Lady Liu that claimed herself to be the biological mother of Qianlong Emperor had been edited to only claiming herself a wet nurse, but Ji Xiaolan still referred her as biological mother of the Emperor.
The years appeared in the series spanned widely, while the age of Du Xiaoyue changed only a little.
In the series Heshen was described as a former imperial guard who was considered to be good at martial arts just as historical accounts recorded, but he always seemed to be without martial ability besides several certain episodes.
In Season 3 the Empress Dowager comforted the Empress that Qianlong Emperor would not dare to take Han women as imperial consorts, and warned the Emperor to obey the ancestral precept and he agreed; all these events are contradicted with the early event he had taken Mo Chou as an imperial consort in Season 1.

Critical reception
The series was one of the most watched ones in mainland China while it was broadcast.

References

External links
 The Eloquent Ji Xiaolan 4 Sina

1999 Chinese television series debuts
Television series set in the Qing dynasty
Mandarin-language television shows
Chinese historical television series
Qianlong Emperor
Television shows written by Zou Jingzhi